Immaculate Conception Parish - designated for Polish immigrants in Springfield, Massachusetts, United States.

 Founded 1905. It is one of the Polish-American Roman Catholic parishes in New England in the Diocese of Springfield in Massachusetts.

Citing insufficient parishioners the diocese had planned to close the parish in 2009. Following closure it would have merged with Christ the King Parish in Ludlow.  However, the local community opposed the move and became the only parish in Springfield proper to receive a temporary reprieve while efforts were made to reverse the decision.. Re-opened in 2018.

References

Bibliography 
 
 The Official Catholic Directory in USA

See also 
 Pastoral planning in Diocese of Springfield in Massachusetts

External links 
 Diocese of Springfield in Massachusetts

Roman Catholic parishes of Diocese of Springfield in Massachusetts
Polish-American Roman Catholic parishes in Massachusetts